Cuijia is a town in Linyi County, Dezhou, in northwestern Shandong province, China.

References

Township-level divisions of Shandong